Heidi Reichinnek (born 19 April 1988) is a German politician and Member of the Bundestag from Die Linke.

She became interested in politics as a teenager, opposing the Hartz IV reforms and supporting women's equality and social welfare. In university, she spent a semester abroad in Cairo in the midst of the Arab Spring and witnessed the Egyptian revolution, which furthered her interest in politics. Reichinnek joined The Left in 2015 and was elected to the city council of Osnabrück the next year. She ran in the 2017 Lower Saxony state election, placed seventh on the party list, but was not elected. In 2019 she became chairwoman of The Left's Lower Saxony branch.

She contested the constituency of Osnabrück City at the 2021 federal election She came in fifth place but was elected to the Bundestag on the state list. Within the party, she is considered a supporter of Sahra Wagenknecht, and in 2019 signed an open letter thanking Wagenknecht for her political work. At the federal Left congress in June 2022, Reichinnek ran unsuccessfully for the party co-leadership, winning 199 votes (35.8%) to incumbent Janine Wissler's 319 (57.5%).

References 

1988 births
Living people
Female members of the Bundestag
21st-century German women politicians
21st-century German politicians
Members of the Bundestag for The Left
Members of the Bundestag 2021–2025
Members of the Bundestag for Lower Saxony
University of Marburg alumni
People from Merseburg